S. proximus may refer to:
 Senoculus proximus, a spider species in the genus Senoculus endemic to Brazil
 Siphonops proximus, an amphibian species
 Spirembolus proximus, a spider species in the genus Spirembolus endemic to the United States

See also
 Proximus (disambiguation)